State Route 524 Spur may refer to:

State Route 524 Spur (Edmonds, Washington), Third Avenue and Pine Street in Edmonds, Washington
State Route 524 Spur (Lynnwood, Washington), 44th Avenue W in Lynnwood, Washington

See also
Washington State Route 524, the parent route running from Edmonds to Lynnwood